Norwood "Pony" Poindexter (February 8, 1926, New Orleans, Louisiana  – April 14, 1988, Oakland, California) was an American jazz saxophonist.

Poindexter began on clarinet and switched to playing alto and tenor sax. In 1940 he studied under Sidney Desvigne, and following World War II attended the newly founded Candell Conservatory of Music in Oakland, California. From 1947 to 1950 he played with Billy Eckstine. In 1950 he played in a quartet with Vernon Alley. From 1951 to 1952, he was with Lionel Hampton and in 1952 he played with Stan Kenton. Neal Hefti wrote the tune "Little Pony", named after Poindexter, for the Count Basie Orchestra. Through the end of the 1950s Poindexter played extensively both as a leader and as a sideman, recording with Charlie Parker, Nat King Cole, T-Bone Walker, and Jimmy Witherspoon. In the early 1960s he began playing the soprano sax as well.

He recorded with Eric Dolphy and Dexter Gordon on a session for Epic Records around 1962. From 1961 to 1964, he accompanied Lambert, Hendricks & Ross. In 1963 he moved to Paris and recorded with Annie Ross. For eight years he lived in Spain and then moved to Mannheim, Germany before returning to the U.S. He published a memoir, 𝘛𝘩𝘦 𝘗𝘰𝘯𝘺 𝘌𝘹𝘱𝘳𝘦𝘴𝘴. 𝘔𝘦𝘮𝘰𝘪𝘳𝘴 𝘰𝘧 𝘢 𝘑𝘢𝘻𝘻 𝘔𝘶𝘴𝘪𝘤𝘪𝘢𝘯, in 1985.

Discography 
 Pony's Express (Epic, 1962)
 Pony Poindexter Plays the Big Ones (New Jazz, 1963)
 Gumbo! (New Jazz, 1963) with Booker Ervin
 Annie Ross & Pony Poindexter (Saba, 1966)
 Alto Summit (MPS, 1968)
 The Happy Life of Pony (Session, 1969)
 Pony Poindexter En Barcelona (Spiral, 1972 re-issue Wah Wah Records 2000)
 Poindexter (Inner City, 1976)
With Dexter Gordon
Stella by Starlight (SteepleChase, 1966 [2005])
With Jon Hendricks
 A Good Git-Together (Pacific, 1959)
With Lambert, Hendricks & Ross
 The Hottest Group in Jazz (Columbia, 1959–62)
With Wes Montgomery
 Far Wes (Pacific Jazz, 1958–59)

References

1926 births
1988 deaths
American jazz saxophonists
American male saxophonists
Prestige Records artists
20th-century American saxophonists
Jazz musicians from Louisiana
20th-century American male musicians
American male jazz musicians